Myrcia luquillensis, the Luquillo forest lidflower, is a species of plant in the family Myrtaceae. It is endemic to Puerto Rico.

References

luquillensis
Endemic flora of Puerto Rico
Vulnerable plants
Taxonomy articles created by Polbot